The Mianyang–Luzhou high-speed railway is a high-speed railway in Sichuan, China. It contains two parts: Neijiang - Zigong - Luzhou section and Zigong - Yibin section. The Neijiang - Zigong - Luzhou section was opened on 28 June 2021, and has the name of "Mianyang–Luzhou high-speed railway Neijiang - Zigong - Luzhou section". And the Zigong - Yibin section is scheduled to open in 2023.

Stations
Neijiang North railway station, Neijiang East railway station, Baima North railway station, Zigong railway station, Fushun railway station, Luxian railway station, Luzhou railway station

History
A groundbreaking ceremony was held in Luzhou on 25 December 2015.

References

High-speed railway lines in China
Rail transport in Sichuan
Railway lines opened in 2021